Irvine Franklin Jeffries (September 10, 1905 – June 8, 1982) was an infielder in Major League Baseball. He played for the Chicago White Sox and Philadelphia Phillies.

External links

1905 births
1982 deaths
Kentucky Wildcats baseball players
Major League Baseball infielders
Chicago White Sox players
Philadelphia Phillies players
Chicago White Sox scouts
Akron Tyrites players
Dallas Steers players
St. Paul Saints (AA) players
Portland Beavers players
Baseball players from Louisville, Kentucky